Louis Finot (1864 in Bar-sur-Aube - 1935 in Toulon) was a French archeologist and researcher, specialising in the cultures of Southeast Asia. A former director of the Ecole française d'Extrême-Orient, his contribution to the study of Khmer history, architecture and epigraphy is widely recognised.

A bachelor of law and letters, Finot was admitted to the École Nationale des Chartes in 1886. He left it two years later with the title of palaeographer. He worked initially as a trainee then as an assistant librarian with the French National Library and undertook studies of Sanskrit. In 1898, he was named director of the archaeological mission in Indochina, which would become in 1900 the Ecole française d'Extrême-Orient (EFEO).  In 1933 he became a member of the Académie des Inscriptions et Belles-Lettres.

Publications
 1896: Les lapidaires indiens, Paris, Émile Bouillon (Bibliothèque de l'École des hautes études), 280 p.
 1901: La religion des Chams d'après des monuments.
 1904: Noté d'épigraphie indochinoise: Les inscriptions de Mi Son.
 1916: Notes d'épigraphie indochinoise, Hanoi, Imprimerie d'Extrême-Orient, 439 p.
 1917: « Recherches sur la littérature laotienne », BEFEO 17/5, p. 1-219.
 1921. « Archéologie indochinoise » et « L'ethnographie indochinoise », BEFEO 21/1, p. 43-166 et 167-196.
 1923: Les questions de Milinda, Milinda-Pañhha. Traduit du pali avec introduction et notes, Paris, Bossard (Les classiques de l'Orient, 8).
 1925: « Lokesvara en Indochine », Paris, EFEO/Van Oest, (PEFEO 19), Études Asiatiques (1), p. 227-256, pl. 16-25.
 1925: « Inscriptions d'Angkor », BEFEO 25/3-4, p. 297-407.
 1926: (with Victor Goloubew et Henri Parmentier), Le temple d'Içvarapura (Banteay Srei, Cambodge), Paris, EFEO (Mémoires archéologiques, 1), 140 p., 72 pl.
 1928: « Nouvelles inscriptions du Cambodge », BEFEO 28/1-2, p. 43-80, pl. 1-5.
 1929-32: (with V. Goloubew et George Coedès), Le temple d'Angkor Vat, Paris, EFEO (Mémoires archéologiques, 2).

References

French archaeologists
French orientalists
French librarians
Historians of Southeast Asia
Academic staff of the Collège de France
Members of the Académie des Inscriptions et Belles-Lettres
École Nationale des Chartes alumni
1864 births
1935 deaths
People from Bar-sur-Aube